Leandro José Zbinden (born 30 July 2002) is a Swiss professional footballer who plays as a goalkeeper for the Swiss club Young Boys.

Professional career
Zbinden is a youth academy of Plaffeien, Fribourg, and Young Boys, before moving to the reserves of Young Boys in 2020. He made his professional debut with Young Boys in a 1–1 Swiss Super League tie with Basel on 15 December 2021.

International career
Born in Switzerland, Zbinden is of Brazilian descent. He is a youth international for Switzerland, having represented the Switzerland U15s in 2016.

References

External links
 
 SFL Profile

2002 births
Living people
People from Fribourg
Swiss men's footballers
Switzerland youth international footballers
Swiss people of Brazilian descent
BSC Young Boys players
Swiss Super League players
Association football goalkeepers
Sportspeople from the canton of Fribourg